Otonephelium is a monotypic genus of flowering plants in the family Sapindaceae, native to southern India. The sole species is Otonephelium stipulaceum. The genus is closely related to Litchi and Dimocarpus.

References

External links

Monotypic Sapindaceae genera
Sapindaceae